Aechmea victoriana is a plant species in the genus Aechmea.

This bromeliad is endemic to the State of Espírito Santo and to the Atlantic Forest biome (Mata Atlantica Brasileira), located in southeastern Brazil.

Cultivars
 Aechmea 'Cherokee Maid'

References

victoriana
Endemic flora of Brazil
Flora of Espírito Santo
Flora of the Atlantic Forest
Plants described in 1941